Thomas L Larson (February 11, 1948 – February 18, 2017) was an American politician and legislator.

Born in Eau Claire, Wisconsin to Wallace and Phyllis (DeLong) Larson, Tom lived in Colfax, Wisconsin and went to Colfax High School. Larson then attended the Chippewa Valley Technical College and was an electrician. He was elected to the Wisconsin State Assembly in 2010 and served until 2017. Larson died in Bloomer, Wisconsin from lung cancer.

References

1948 births
2017 deaths
Politicians from Eau Claire, Wisconsin
People from Colfax, Wisconsin
Chippewa Valley Technical College alumni
American electricians
Republican Party members of the Wisconsin State Assembly
21st-century American politicians
Deaths from cancer in Wisconsin
Deaths from lung cancer